The French Polynesia women's national handball team is the national women's handball team of Tahiti.

Pacific Handball Cup record

French Pacific Handball Cup record

External links
 Profile on International Handball Federation webpage
 Oceania Continent Handball Federation webpage

Women's national handball teams
Women's handball in France
Handball